Goat's Water is a small accessible tarn in the English Lake District, located between Dow Crag and The Old Man of Coniston to the Duddon Valley, near the town of Coniston.

References

Lakes of the Lake District
South Lakeland District